Charles Parsons Reichel was an Anglican bishop and author in the 19th century. He was born in 1816, educated at Trinity College, Dublin and  ordained in 1847. After a curacy at St. Mary's Church, Dublin he was Professor of Latin at Queen's College, Belfast from 1850 to 1864. A son, Sir Harry Reichel, was the first Principal of the University College of North Wales, Bangor, and a Vice-Chancellor of the University of Wales. During his career he held  incumbencies at Trim, Mullingar and  Clonmacnoise. He was Archdeacon of Meath from 1875 to 1882;Dean of Clonmacnoise from 1882 to 1885 before being consecrated Bishop of Meath in 1885, a position he held until his death on 29 March 1894.

Arms

Notes

1816 births
1894 deaths
People from Pudsey
Alumni of Trinity College Dublin
Academics of Queen's University Belfast
19th-century Anglican bishops in Ireland
Anglican bishops of Meath
Deans of Clonmacnoise